La Résistance, literally "The Resistance", typically refers to the French Resistance against German occupation in World War II.

La Résistance may also refer to:

 La Résistance (professional wrestling), a professional wrestling team
"La Resistance (Medley)", a song from the soundtrack of South Park: Bigger, Longer & Uncut

See also
Resistance (disambiguation)